is the third single by Japanese girl group Melon Kinenbi. Its highest position on the Oricon weekly chart was #53.

Track listing

External links
Denwa Matteimasu at the Up-Front Works release list (Zetima)(Japanese)

2001 singles
Zetima Records singles
Song recordings produced by Tsunku
2001 songs